Saldaña or Saldana may refer to:

People
Brandon Saldaña (born 1991), American footballer
Carlos Saldaña (born 1947), Mexican comic book author
Diana Saldaña (born 1971), United States District Judge
Excilia Saldaña (1946–1999), Afro-Cuban author
Gisela Lara Saldaña (born 1956), Mexican politician
Jaime Verdín Saldaña (born 1962), Mexican politician
Joe Saldana (born 1944), American racing driver
Joey Saldana (born 1972), American racing driver, son of Joe Saldana
José M. Saldaña, Puerto Rican academic
José Saldaña (born 1947), Peruvian politician
Julio Saldaña (born 1967), Argentine footballer
Lori Saldaña (born 1958), American politician
María Elena Saldaña, Mexican actress
María Lucero Saldaña (born 1957), Mexican politician
Nelson Saldana, American cyclist
Ponciano Saldaña (born 1928), Filipino Olympic basketball player
Sarah Saldaña, former director of U.S. Immigration and Customs Enforcement
Terry Saldaña (born 1958), Filipino basketball player
Theresa Saldana (1954–2016), American actress and author
Todd Saldana (born 1962), American footballer
Tomás Saldaña (born 1961), Spanish racing driver
Zoe Saldana (born 1978), American actress

Places
Saldaña, Palencia, a town in Spain
Saldaña, Colombia, a town and municipality in the Tolima department of Colombia
Saldaña de Burgos, a municipality in the province of Burgos, Castile and León, Spain
Saldaña River, a river of Colombia

See also
 Saldanha (disambiguation)

Spanish-language surnames